The 2017 Grand Prix Cycliste de Montréal is a road cycling one-day race that took place on 10 September. It was the 8th edition of the Grand Prix Cycliste de Montréal and the 34th event of the 2017 UCI World Tour. It was won by Diego Ulissi.

Result

References

Grand Prix Cycliste de Montreal
Grand Prix Cycliste de Montreal
Grand Prix Cycliste de Montréal
2017 in Quebec
September 2017 sports events in Canada